Carl Otto Løvenskiold (23 December 1839 – 1 October 1916) was a Norwegian naval officer, business executive and landowner. He served as the Norwegian prime minister in Stockholm during 1884. By birth, he is a member of Løvenskiold noble family.

Biography
Løvenskiold was born in Christiania (now Oslo), Norway on 23 December 1839. He was the son of Otto Joachim Løvenskiold (1811-1882) and Julie Caroline Helene Wedel-Jarlsberg (1815-1840). His father was a Supreme Court Attorney and mayor of Christiania. He attended Christiania Cathedral School, became a sea cadet at Frederiksvern and a second lieutenant in the Royal Norwegian Navy in 1859. In 1868 Løvenskiold was promoted to first lieutenant. In 1875, he resigned from naval service. He entered into the operation of the business interests of his father-in-law Harald Wedel Jarlsberg in Bærum and Aker, including Bærum Verk and Nordmarka.

He was a Prime Minister in Stockholm in 1884 during Schweigaard's Ministerium. He served as a member of the Parliament of Norway (Storting) from 1889 to 1897  representing Akershus for the Conservative Party.

Løvenskiold was nominated as a Knight in the Order of St. Olav in 1889, Knight 1st Class in 1899 and Commander in 1912. He also was a recipient  of the Order of Vasa. The Spitsbergen icecap Løvenskioldfonna and the mountain ridge Carlsfjella were named in his honor.

Personal life
In 1865, he married  his  cousin Elise Wedel Jarlsberg (1844-1923), daughter of landowner  Harald Wedel Jarlsberg (1811–97) and Elise Frederikke Butenschøn (1820–68). They were the parents of Harald Løvenskiold (1868–1934). Løvenskiold died on 1 October 1916 and was buried in the family grave site at  Ullern Church (Ullern kirkegård) in Oslo.

References

1839 births
1916 deaths
Military personnel from Oslo
People educated at Oslo Cathedral School
Royal Norwegian Navy personnel
Members of the Storting
Akershus politicians
Conservative Party (Norway) politicians
19th-century Norwegian politicians
Government ministers of Norway
Carl Otto
Grand Crosses of the Order of Vasa
Recipients of the St. Olav's Medal